The 2014–15 South of Scotland Football League, was the 69th season of the South of Scotland Football League, and the 1st season as the sixth tier of the Scottish football pyramid system. Wigtown & Bladnoch were the defending champions.

This season saw the introduction of three new member clubs, including two from the recently defunct Dumfries & District Amateur Football League, Upper Annandale and Dumfries YMCA.  Edusport Academy were the additional new entrant.

The championship was successfully retained by Wigtown & Bladnoch, who overhauled long-time leaders Newton Stewart  to win their first back-to-back league titles in the history of the club.  Confirmation of Wigtown's success came as Newton Stewart were deducted six points for failing to fulfil a fixture at Abbey Vale and Wigtown beat Nithsdale Wanderers 2–0 therefore making it mathematically impossible for Newton Stewart to win the title.

This was the first season in which the league was added to the Scottish league pyramid system at level six, with the winner due to face the East of Scotland League champions for a place in the Lowland League.  However, as Wigtown & Bladnoch did not meet the required licensing criteria for promotion, no play-off took place and they remained in the division for the following season.

Teams

The following teams changed prior to the 2014–15 season.

To South of Scotland League
 Dumfries YMCA
 Edusport Academy
 Upper Annandale

League table

References

5